Milan Ilić may refer to:

Milan Ilić (footballer, born 1987), Serbian football centre back
Milan Ilić (footballer, born 2000), Serbian football right back
Milan Ilić (politician) (born 1990), Serbian politician